The 1882–83 season was Morton Football Club's seventh season in which they competed at a national level, entering the Scottish Cup.

Fixtures and results

Scottish Cup

1. Morton v Kilmarnock Athletic result was declared void.

Renfrewshire Cup

Friendlies

2. Paisley Athletic did not turn up.
3. Thistle could not appear and sent a telegram, which Morton did not receive until near kick-off.

References

External links
Greenock Morton FC official site

Greenock Morton F.C. seasons
Morton